Giovanni Lapentti was the title defender, but he retired in the semifinal, when the result was 3–6 for Vincent Millot.
Horacio Zeballos won in the final 3–6, 7–5, 6–3, against Vincent Millot.

Seeds

Draw

Final four

Top half

Bottom half

References
 Main Draw
 Qualifying Draw

Manta Open - Trofeo Ricardo Delgado Aray - Singles
Manta Open